The Negotiator is a 1998 American action thriller film directed by F. Gary Gray. It stars Samuel L. Jackson and Kevin Spacey as two expert hostage negotiators and Chicago police lieutenants. The film was released in the United States on July 29, 1998, receiving generally positive reviews from critics and grossing $88 million worldwide.

Plot
Lieutenant Danny Roman, a top hostage negotiator for the Chicago Police Department's east precinct, is told by his partner, Nate Roenick, that according to an informant whom he refuses to name, members of their own unit are embezzling large amounts of money from the department's disability fund, for which Roman is a board member. Roenick tells Roman that his informant hasn't told Internal Affairs because he thinks they might be involved as well. Roman goes to meet Roenick, but finds him dead in his car with a bullet wound in his head and his car window shattered by gunfire before he can talk to him, and a squad car arrives on the scene within seconds, considering Roman a prime suspect.

Matters become worse for Roman when IAD inspector Terence Niebaum, whom Roenick's informant suspected of involvement in the embezzlement, is assigned to investigate the murder. After the gun that killed Roenick, found in the lake next to Roenick's car, is linked to a case Roman had worked on, Niebaum and other investigators search the Roman house and discover papers for an offshore bank account with a deposit equal to one of the amounts of money embezzled. Roman is forced to surrender his gun and badge, and his colleagues are skeptical of his protestations of innocence. With embezzlement and homicide charges pending, Roman storms into Niebaum's office and demands answers about who set him up. When Niebaum refuses to answer, Roman takes Niebaum, his administrative assistant Maggie, Roman's commander and friend Grant Frost and con man Rudy Timmons as hostages.

With the building evacuated and placed under siege by his own CPD unit and the FBI, Roman issues his conditions: his badge, locating Roenick's informant and killer, a department funeral if he dies and summoning police lieutenant Chris Sabian, the city's other top negotiator. Roman believes he can trust Sabian, because he talks for as long as possible, sees tactical action as a last resort, and being from the CPD's west precinct eliminates him as a suspect in the disability fund scheme. Sabian clashes with Roman's precinct, particularly commander Adam Beck, but is given temporary command of the unit after they hastily attempt a breach that goes awry, resulting in SWAT officers Scott and Markus becoming hostages and Scott is supposedly killed.

Roman trades Frost to Sabian in exchange for restoring the building's electricity, having been turned off after the hostage execution. With help from Rudy and Maggie, Roman accesses Niebaum's computer and discovers the scheme: corrupt officers submitted false disability claims that were processed by an unknown insider on the disability fund's board. He also discovers recordings of wiretaps, including a conversation between Roenick and his widow that suggests he was going to meet his informant before he was killed. Sabian, using the information Roman provided, claims to have located Roenick's informant in a bid to get Roman to release the hostages. Roman realizes Sabian is bluffing when Niebaum's files reveal Roenick himself was the IAD informant.

When Roman threatens to expose Niebaum in his office's open window, leaving him vulnerable to sniper fire, Niebaum admits that Roenick gave him wiretaps, implicating three of their squad mates in the embezzlement scheme: Allen, Hellman and Argento. When Niebaum confronted the guilty officers, he received a bribe from them to cover up their crimes. The guilty officers attempted to bribe Roenick, but he refused to take the money, resulting in his murder. Niebaum says he doesn't know who the ringleader is, but that he has safely hidden the taps corroborating the three officers' guilt. The same corrupt officers have secretly entered the room via the air vents under the pretext of being part of a team to take Roman out in case he started killing the hostages; upon hearing Niebaum's confession, they open fire and murder him before he can reveal where he has hidden the wiretaps. Roman single-handedly fends them and the rest of his squad off, using the flashbangs he seized from the two officers in the previous failed breach.

Believing that Sabian and the police can't resolve the situation, the FBI assume jurisdiction over the operation, cease negotiations, relieve the lieutenant of his command, and order a full breach. As Roman prepares for his eventual arrest, Maggie tells him that Niebaum also worked from his house and could've kept Roenick's wiretaps there. Sabian confronts Roman to warn him about the breach, and the latter reveals that Scott is still alive and gagged with duct tape. Sabian begins to believe in Roman's innocence and gives him a chance to prove his case. While the FBI and SWAT raid the building and rescue the hostages, Roman disguises himself as a SWAT member and escapes through the vents.

The two negotiators proceed to Niebaum's house, but they can't find the wiretaps. The police arrive and the corrupt officers enter the house, but they back off as Frost enters and tries to talk Roman down. Sabian observes Frost discreetly locking the front door and taking one of the loaded guns and realizes that he is the ringleader of the conspiracy, the insider on the disability fund's board and Roenick's killer. In front of Frost, Sabian seemingly kills Roman and offers to destroy the evidence on floppy disks they have uncovered in return for a cut of Frost's take. Frost agrees and effectively makes a full admission to his and the other three officers' crimes before crushing the floppy disks and shooting Niebaum's computer. When Frost exits the house, he discovers that Sabian only wounded Roman, who used a police radio microphone to broadcast his entire confession to the police surrounding the area. Humiliated, Frost attempts to commit suicide, but is shot in the shoulder by Beck and arrested along with the other corrupt officers. As Roman is loaded into an ambulance with his wife, Sabian gives his badge to him and departs.

Cast

In addition, Paul Guilfoyle appears in the uncredited role of Nate Roenick, Danny Roman‘s partner, whose murder precipitates the action of the film. Tom Bower also appears uncredited as Omar, an unhinged man whom Danny negotiates with at the beginning of the film.

Production notes
The film is dedicated to J. T. Walsh, who died several months before the film's release.

The building used for the IAD office is 77 West Wacker Drive, the headquarters of United Airlines.

Factual basis
This film's conspiracy plotline is loosely based on the pension fund scandal in the St. Louis Police Department in the late 1980s and early 1990s.

Reception

Box office
The Negotiator made $10.2 million in its opening weekend, finishing first at the box office. It went on to finish with a worldwide gross of $88 million. Warner Bros. spent $40.3 million promoting the film, and lost an estimated $13 million after all revenues and expenses were factored together.

Critical response
On Rotten Tomatoes, the film holds an approval rating of 74% based on 57 reviews, with an average rating of 6.70/10. The website's critical consensus reads: "The Negotiators battle of wits doesn't wholly justify its excessive length, but confident direction by F. Gary Gray and formidable performances makes this a situation audiences won't mind being hostage to." On Metacritic, the film has a weighted average score 62 out of 100, based on 24 critics, indicating "generally favorable reviews". Audiences polled by CinemaScore gave the film an average grade of "A" on an A+ to F scale.

Emanuel Levy of Variety wrote: "Teaming for the first time Kevin Spacey and Samuel L. Jackson, arguably the two best actors of their generation, in perfectly fitting roles is a shrewd move and the best element of this fact-inspired but overwrought thriller." Roger Ebert, in his Chicago Sun-Times review, calls The Negotiator "a triumph of style over story, and of acting over characters...Much of the movie simply consists of closeups of the two of them talking, but it's not simply dialogue because the actors make it more—invest it with conviction and urgency..."

Mick LaSalle, in his less-than-enthusiastic review for the San Francisco Chronicle, had the most praise for Spacey's performance: "Kevin Spacey is the main reason to see The Negotiator...Spacey's special gift is his ability to make sanity look radiant...In The Negotiator, as in L.A. Confidential, he gives us a man uniquely able to accept, face and deal with the truth."

Accolades

References

External links

 
 
 
 
 
 

1998 films
1998 crime drama films
1998 crime thriller films
1990s thriller drama films
American crime drama films
American crime thriller films
American police detective films
American thriller drama films
Fictional portrayals of the Chicago Police Department
Films about hostage takings
Films directed by F. Gary Gray
Films scored by Graeme Revell
Films set in Chicago
Films shot in Chicago
Films with screenplays by James DeMonaco
Mandeville Films films
Regency Enterprises films
Warner Bros. films
Films about police corruption
Films produced by David Hoberman
Films produced by Arnon Milchan
1990s English-language films
1990s American films